Rodgers Flat (formerly, Camp Rodgers) is an unincorporated community in Plumas County, California. It lies at an elevation of 2096 feet (639 m).

The Camp Rodgers post office operated from 1916 to 1936.

References

Unincorporated communities in California
Unincorporated communities in Plumas County, California